This is a list of tariffs and trade legislation:

 List of tariffs in Canada
 List of tariffs in China
 List of tariffs in France
 List of tariffs in Germany
 List of tariffs in India
 List of tariffs in Pakistan
 List of tariffs in Russia
 List of tariffs in South Africa
 List of tariffs in the United Kingdom
 List of tariffs in the United States

History of international trade
International trade-related lists